Helman Nkosiyethu Mkhalele (born 20 October 1969) is a South African former soccer player who played as a midfielder. He was the part of the Orlando Pirates squad that won the 1994 National Soccer League and 1995 African Cup of Champions Clubs.

Personal life
His brothers Sydney Mkhalele and Lazarus Mkhalele played in the NPSL. He currently resides in Roodepoort

After retirement
Mkhalele got a job as a facilitator at KBC Health and Safety Company. He owns a furniture business. He acquired a teachers' diploma at the Soweto College He is the current National under 20 coach football team.

International
Mkhalele played for South Africa national football team, earning 66 caps and scoring 8 goals in the process and was in part of the squad that travelled to France for the 1998 FIFA World Cup. He was also part of the Bafana squad that lifted the 1996 African Cup of Nations. He made his debut on 26 November 1994 against Ghana when he was 25 years and 37 days old, he played his last international on 5 May 2001 against Zimbabwe when he was 31 years and 197 days. His international career lasted for 6 years and 160 days.

There are townships in South Africa that are named after him; one is Mkhelele (also called Evaton West) in Evaton which is located in the south of Johannesburg.

Career statistics

International goals

References

External links

sasportslife.com – profile

1969 births
Living people
People from Newcastle, KwaZulu-Natal
Soccer players from KwaZulu-Natal
South African soccer players
South Africa international soccer players
1996 African Cup of Nations players
1998 African Cup of Nations players
2000 African Cup of Nations players
1997 FIFA Confederations Cup players
1998 FIFA World Cup players
Jomo Cosmos F.C. players
Orlando Pirates F.C. players
Kayserispor footballers
MKE Ankaragücü footballers
Göztepe S.K. footballers
Malatyaspor footballers
Süper Lig players
Expatriate footballers in Turkey
South African expatriate soccer players
South African expatriate sportspeople in Turkey
Association football midfielders